Goodenia holtzeana is a species of flowering plant in the family Goodeniaceae and is endemic to northern parts of the Northern Territory. It is a prostrate to ascending or erect annual plant with egg-shaped to lance-shaped stem-leaves with the narrower end towards the base, and racemes of yellow flowers with brownish markings.

Description
The stem leaves are smaller and egg-shaped to elliptic. Flowering occurs from February to June and the fruit is a more or less spherical or oval nut  in diameter.

Taxonomy and naming
This species was first formally described in 1958 by Raymond Specht who gave it the name Calogyne holtzeana in the Records of the American-Australian Scientific Expedition to Arnhem Land from specimens collected by Maurice William Holtze near Port Darwin. In 1990 Roger Charles Carolin changed the name to Goodenia holtzeana in the journal Telopea. The specific epithet (holtzeana) honours the collector of the type specimens.

Distribution and habitat
This goodenia grows in forest in arid environments in the Top End region of the Northern Territory.

Conservation status
Goodenia holtzeana is list as of "least concern" under the Northern Territory Government Territory Parks and Wildlife Conservation Act 1976.

References

holtzeana
Flora of the Northern Territory
Plants described in 1958